Arr  is a town and commune in the Guidimaka Region of south-eastern Mauritania.

In 2000 it had a population of 12,232.

References

External links
Official site

Communes of Mauritania
Guidimaka Region